Frederick John Robinson (13 June 1938 – 23 November 2000) was an Australian rules footballer who played for North Melbourne in the Victorian Football League (VFL) during the early 1960s.

A defender, Robinson was recruited from Kyabram District Football League club Murchison and played four games in his debut season but ten in the 1961 VFL season, gathering three Brownlow Medal votes. After managing only one appearance in 1962, Robinson joined Victorian Football Association (VFA) club Brunswick and performed well for the club as a full-back. He finished third in the J. J. Liston Trophy in 1965, and was a VFA representative at the 1966 Hobart Carnival.

Robinson's grandson Daniel Venables played for the West Coast Eagles in the Australian Football League.

References

Holmesby, Russell and Main, Jim (2007). The Encyclopedia of AFL Footballers. 7th ed. Melbourne: Bas Publishing.

1939 births
2000 deaths
North Melbourne Football Club players
Brunswick Football Club players
Murchison Football Club players
Australian rules footballers from Victoria (Australia)